Tulliallan Castle is a large house in Kincardine, Fife, Scotland. It has been the home of the Scottish Police College since 1954. On 1 April 2013, Tulliallan Castle became the headquarters of Police Scotland (the newly created national police service for Scotland), but in 2014 the service's headquarters temporarily relocated to nearby Stirling in the former Central Scotland Police HQ.

14th-century castle
A fortified house with a keep and rib-vaulted ground floor, it was abandoned in the seventeenth century.

19th-century castle
The castle was built in 1812–1820 for Admiral Lord Keith, one time senior officer of Lord Nelson, paid for with prize money. The labour force said to include French prisoners of war.

During the Second World War it was used by the Polish Armed Forces in the West as their headquarters in Scotland.

Prior to the Second World War there was no central training for police officers in Scotland. After the war it was decided to centralise all police training and Tulliallan was the result. Tulliallan, from the Gaelic Tulach-Aluin ('beautiful knoll') was purchased in 1950 by the then Scottish Home Department for £9,100. The building was modernised and renovated and the first courses for inspectors and sergeants began in 1954. Over the years the site has been heavily modified to provide accommodation, catering, training, and teaching facilities for the Scottish Police College.

The building is now used as the administrative head of the Scottish Police College and also serves as the official residence of the Chief Constable of Police Scotland.

References

External links

Gazetteer for Scotland entry for Old Tulliallan Castle

1820 establishments in Scotland
Castles in Fife
Category A listed buildings in Fife
Country houses in Fife
Houses completed in 1820
Inventory of Gardens and Designed Landscapes
Listed castles in Scotland
Listed government buildings in Scotland
Official residences in the United Kingdom